Ladislava Aloisie Bakanic (May 3, 1924 – February 26, 2021) was an American gymnast who competed in the 1948 Summer Olympics and won team bronze. She was born in New York City.

References

1924 births
2021 deaths
American female artistic gymnasts
Gymnasts at the 1948 Summer Olympics
Olympic bronze medalists for the United States in gymnastics
Medalists at the 1948 Summer Olympics
21st-century American women